The New York Youth Symphony (NYYS), founded in 1963, is a tuition-free music organization for the youth in New York City, widely reputed to be one of the best of its kind in the nation and world. Its programs include its flagship Orchestra, Chamber Music, Jazz, Apprentice Conducting, Composition, and Musical Theater Songwriting Programs. Its members range from 12 to 22 years of age. NYYS members are said to include the most talented young musicians in the New York metropolitan area. In 2023, the New York Youth Symphony won the Grammy Award for Best Orchestral Performance at the 65th Annual Grammy Awards.

The NYYS is also a leader in classical music with its innovative commissioning program called First Music, established in 1984, in which young composers under the age of 30 are selected to write works for the programs. Commissions have included composers such as David Lang, Augusta Read Thomas, Julia Wolfe, and Aaron Jay Kernis.

Orchestra
The Orchestra Program, the flagship program of the NYYS, has had a tradition of seeking the best young orchestral talent in the New York area from ages 12 to 22. The New York Times wrote: "its players ... are sufficiently devoted to the music that when they perform at Carnegie Hall ... they produce a sound that would do an adult orchestra proud, in programs built largely of cornerstones of the standard canon."

The orchestra performs three concerts per year, each of which is performed at Carnegie Hall. The New York Times reported: "Its Carnegie Hall concerts are always ambitious and usually excellent". Each program usually includes, at least, a cornerstone of the orchestral repertoire and a premiere of a commissioned work. Usually a soloist or soloists perform, either an established artist, or a young artist as presented by the Roy and Shirley Durst Debut Series which was founded in 1997. The first Durst artist was Alisa Weilerstein.

The orchestra has not appointed established educators to fill its role as music director. Rather, it has had music directors who at the time were young; many of those conductors have become renowned. The music directors of the Orchestra have been:

 
 David Epstein (1963–66)
 Leonard Slatkin (1966–68)
 Richard Holmes (1968–69)
 Isaiah Jackson (1969–73)
 David Stahl (1973–74)
 Kenneth Jean (1974–76)
 Myung-Whun Chung (1976–77)
 Robert Hart Baker (1977–81)
 Salvatore Scecchitano (1981–82)
 David Alan Miller (1982–88)
 Samuel Wong (1988–93)
 Miguel Harth Bedoya (1993–97)
 Mischa Santora (1997–2002)
 Paul Haas (2002–07)
 Ryan McAdams (2007–12)
 Joshua Gersen (2012–2017)
 Michael Repper (2017–present)

Michael Repper is the current music director, with assistant conductor Tanya Chanphanitpornkit.

Chamber music
The Chamber Music Program (CMP) provides musicians aged 12 to 22 opportunity to participate in chamber ensembles of a variety of instrumentations. The current director is Dr. Lisa Tipton, of the Meridian Quartet.

The program uses established musicians teach master classes for the students. Past coaches have included:

Claude Frank, concert pianist
Kazuhide Isomura, viola, The Tokyo Quartet
Kathe Jarka, Alexander teacher
Gilbert Kalish, concert pianist
Ani Kavafian, violin/viola, Chamber Music Society of Lincoln Center
Alan Kay, clarinet, Orpheus Program Coordinator
Joel Krosnick, cello, Juilliard String Quartet
Anne-Marie McDermott, piano
Frank Morelli, bassoon, Orpheus Chamber Orchestra
Charles Neidich, clarinet, faculty of the Juilliard School
Daniel Phillips, violin, The Orion Quartet
Shanghai Quartet members
Fred Sherry, cello, Chamber Music Society of Lincoln Center
Carol Wincenc, flute, The New York Woodwind Quintet
Carmit Zori, violin

Jazz Band
The New York Youth Symphony Jazz Band is a 17-member big band dedicated to studying, rehearsing, and performing jazz music. Modeled on the bands of the 1930s and 1940s, Jazz Band preserves this heritage and, keeping with jazz traditions, incorporates it into the current and emerging styles that define the genre for the present generation. The Jazz Band performs at renowned venues all over New York City including Birdland and Jazz at Lincoln Center.

The Jazz Band has featured soloists and clinicians such as Joe Lovano, Maria Schneider, Conrad Herwig, Steve Turre, Warren Vaché, Victor Goines, Slide Hampton, Jimmy Heath, Joe Locke, Eric Reed, Lew Soloff, Gary Smulyan, and Frank Wess, giving students a chance to play alongside today's most exciting professional musicians.

Composition
The Composition Program is a series of workshops for young musicians to explore the world of composition and orchestration. The current director is Kyle Blaha, who succeeded Anna Clyne, four-time winner of ASCAP Plus award.  The founding director was Derek Bermel.

Guest lecturers have included: Laurie Anderson, violinist, 
Robert Beaser, composer,
Christopher Theofanidis, composer,
Jennifer Higdon, composer,
Paquito D'Rivera, jazz clarinet and saxophone,
ETHEL,
Nico Muhly,
Stephen Sondheim,
John Corigliano,
Aaron Jay Kernis, composer, 
Steve Reich, composer, and 
Kathleen Supové, pianist.

Alumni

Alumni include violinists Marin Alsop, Pamela Frank, Cho-Liang Lin, Shlomo Mintz, and Peter Oundjian; violist Lawrence Dutton; conductor and trumpeter Gerard Schwarz; flutist Ransom Wilson; and members of the Juilliard, Emerson, Tokyo, Shanghai, and Mendelssohn String Quartets, the Metropolitan Opera Orchestra, the New York Philharmonic, the Gewandhaus Orchestra of Leipzig, the Israel Philharmonic, the London Symphony Orchestra, and other major ensembles throughout the world.

Reviews
New York's major arts reviews regularly critique the Symphony's concerts:

The New York Sun has called the orchestra "America's best youth symphony."

Controversy

The New York Youth Symphony abruptly canceled the Carnegie Hall performance of a piece it had commissioned after it was discovered to include a 45-second musical quote of the Horst Wessel Song, written by Sturmführer Horst Wessel, a district leader in Hitler's Sturmabteilung (SA). An anthem of the Nazi Party from 1930 to 1945, it is now banned in Germany and Austria.

The canceled performance was of  "Marsh u Nebuttya" ("March to Oblivion," in Ukrainian), a commissioned 9-minute piece composed by Estonian-born Jonas Tarm, a 21-year-old junior at the New England Conservatory of Music. Shauna Quill, executive director of the Symphony, said the decision to pull the piece was informed by Tarm's refusal, when asked, to explain why the excerpt is included in the work. Tarm said: "I really do believe it can speak for itself." In a later statement, Tarm added that the piece is "devoted to the victims who have suffered from cruelty and hatred of war, totalitarianism, polarizing nationalism — in the past and today."

References

External links
"Thoughts On the New York Youth Symphony", December 6, 2010, Review of performance at Carnegie Hall by local pop culture blogger

American youth orchestras
Youth organizations based in New York City
1963 establishments in New York (state)
Musical groups established in 1963
Orchestras based in New York City